The South African cricket team toured England in the 2003 season to play a five-match Test series against England. The two teams also took part in a triangular One Day International tournament involving Zimbabwe.

The Test series was drawn 2-2, with the first match resulted in a draw, while the triangular series was won by England, after beating South Africa in the final by 7 wickets.

Tour matches

50-over: Sussex v South Africans

50-over: Northamptonshire v South Africans

50-over: Worcestershire v South Africans

First-class: Somerset v South Africans

First-class: India A v South Africans

First-class: Kent v South Africans

First-class: Derbyshire v South Africans

NatWest Series (ODI)

2nd Match: England v South Africa

3rd Match: South Africa v Zimbabwe

5th Match: England v South Africa

6th Match: South Africa v Zimbabwe

8th Match: England v South Africa

9th Match: South Africa v Zimbabwe

Final: England v South Africa

Test series

1st Test

2nd Test

3rd Test

4th Test

5th Test

References
 Playfair Cricket Annual 2004
 Wisden Cricketers Almanack 2004

External links
 CricketArchive

2003 in English cricket
2003
International cricket competitions in 2003